The men's 5000 metres event at the 1951 Pan American Games was held at the Estadio Monumental in Buenos Aires on 1 March.

Results

References

Athletics at the 1951 Pan American Games
1951